Middle East Business Aviation Association or MEBAA, is a non-profit corporation based in Dubai, United Arab Emirates. The Association, established in 2006 and as of this writing, represents 185 members. The Association is set up to provide an effective communication between Middle East business aviation operators and suppliers, and governments of the region, business leaders and the media, on matters concerning and affecting business aviation. Key objectives of the Association are to enhance safety, security, efficiency and acceptance of business aviation in the region through communication and ongoing dialogue. Membership groups include operators, suppliers and affiliates.

References

External links 
MEBAA.com

Aviation organizations